Earl Sydney, of Scadbury in the County of Kent, was a title in the Peerage of the United Kingdom. It was created in 1874 for John Townshend, 3rd Viscount Sydney.

Earl Sydney (1874) 
The titles of Baron Sydney (third creation; 1783) and Viscount Sydney (second creation; 1789), were created in the Peerage of Great Britain, for the politician Thomas Townshend (1733–1800), known as Lord Sydney.

Townshend was then succeeded by his son, John Thomas Townshend, 2nd Viscount Sydney (1764–1831).

On his death, the titles passed to his son, the Liberal politician John Robert Townshend, 3rd Viscount Sydney (1805–1890), who was then elevated to the title of earl in 1874. Earl Sydney notably served as Lord Chamberlain of the Household and as Lord Steward of the Household. On his death in 1890, however, in the absence of an heir, all his titles became extinct.

See also
Earl of Leicester (1618 creation)
Marquess Townshend
Frognal House

References

External links 

Portraits at the National Gallery
Emily Caroline (née Paget), Countess Sydney at the National Gallery
 Correspondence at the National Archives
Townshends of Scadbury and Frognal - family landholding and Frognal House

 
Extinct earldoms in the Peerage of the United Kingdom
Earl Sydney
1874 establishments in the United Kingdom
1890 disestablishments in the United Kingdom
Noble titles created in 1874
Noble titles created for UK MPs